Cavan is a rural community situated on the south bank of the Murrumbidgee River in the Yass Valley Shire. It is situated by road, about 40 kilometres southwest of Yass and 43 northwest of Canberra. It was named after the town of Cavan in Ireland. It is reportedly owned by Rupert Murdoch.

Cavan Post Office opened on 1 March 1887, closed in 1902, reopened in 1913 and closed in 1951.

References

Localities in New South Wales
Yass Valley Council
Southern Tablelands